Akerele is a surname. Notable people with the surname include:

Dorothy Akerele (1913–2007), British-Nigerian musician and hostess, wife of Oni
Olubanke King Akerele (born 1946), Liberian politician and diplomat
Oni Akerele (died 1983), Nigerian medical doctor